(born 14 October 1964 as Kazuyasu Hato) is a former sumo wrestler and politician from Kagoshima Prefecture, Japan. He began his sumo career in 1980, reaching the top division in 1989. He was one of the lightest men in makuuchi. but he nevertheless reached the fourth highest rank of komusubi and won four special prizes. After retiring in 1996 he was elected to the Japanese Diet, serving until 2000. He is now a businessman.

Sumo career 
Kyokudozan was born in Tokyo, but moved to his mother's hometown of Tokunoshima in Ōshima District as a child. In high school he was offered a volleyball scholarship, but he opted for sumo. He joined the newly formed Ōshima stable, making his professional debut in May 1980. He was one of the lightest sumo wrestlers ever, capable of running the 100 metres in 11 seconds. He did not reach 100 kg in weight until 1989, the year he was promoted to the top makuuchi division. Kyokudozan stayed in the top division for 48 tournaments. Mainoumi was the only makuuchi wrestler lighter than himself during this period. In May 1992 he defeated ōzeki Konishiki, winner of the previous tournament and some 150 kg heavier than him, with the rare leg-sweeping technique ketaguri. In September 1992 he reached his highest rank of komusubi. Unusually for someone making their san'yaku debut he was able to hold his rank. For this he was awarded the Kantō-shō, or Fighting Spirit prize. In March 1993 he defeated the newly crowned Yokozuna Akebono to earn his only kinboshi.

Political career 
In October 1996 Kyokudozan submitted his retirement papers to the Sumo Association and announced he would run for election to the Diet of Japan. He stood for the New Frontier Party and was elected to the lower House of Representatives, representing the Kansai region. When his party was disbanded he joined the New Peace Party (now New Komeito) before continuing as an independent. In May 2000 he announced he would not stand in the next general election and was retiring from politics.

Later career 
Kyokudozan subsequently moved to Osaka, where he set up a business, running a health food company. He was also involved in local politics in the area. In 2008 he attended the retirement ceremony of former stablemate Kyokutenzan. He also occasionally commentates on sumo broadcasts. His younger brother remains in sumo, as a gyōji or referee, and is known as Kimura Hisanosuke. He is affiliated to Tomozuna stable (where all Ōshima stable personnel moved to upon its closure) and referees at makuuchi level.

Fighting style 
Despite his light weight Kyokudozan preferred yotsu-sumo techniques, fighting his opponent at close quarters on the mawashi. His favourite grip was migi-yotsu, with his left hand outside and right hand inside his opponent's arms. His most common winning kimarite was yorikiri (force out), but he also regularly used his left hand grip to win with uwatenage, or outer arm throw.

Career record

See also 
 Glossary of sumo terms
 List of past sumo wrestlers
List of komusubi

References

External links

1964 births
Living people
Japanese sumo wrestlers
Sumo people from Kagoshima Prefecture
Komusubi
Members of the House of Representatives (Japan)
Japanese sportsperson-politicians
People from the Amami Islands
New Frontier Party (Japan) politicians
20th-century Japanese politicians
New Komeito politicians